This is the list of railway stations serving the district of Trivandrum in the Indian state of Kerala.

 Kappil Railway Station
 Edava Railway Station
Varkala Railway Station 
 Akathumuri railway station
 Kadakkavoor railway station 
 Chirayinkeezhu railway station 
 Perunguzhi Railway Station
 Murukkumpuzha Railway Station
 Kaniyapuram railway station 
 Kazhakoottam railway station 
 Veli Railway Station
 Kochuveli railway station 
 Thiruvananthapuram Pettah railway station 
Thiruvananthapuram Central 
 Nemom railway station
 Balaramapuram railway station
 Neyyattinkara railway station 
 Amaravila Railway Station
 Dhanuvachapuram Railway Station
 Parassala Railway Station 

Trivandrum
Stations
Thiruvananthapuram-related lists